The Parkcross, also named Cyclocross Vossenhol-Maldegem is a cyclo-cross race held in Maldegem, Belgium. The men's race was held for the first time in 2007, the women's race in 2015.

Past winners

Men

Women

References

 Results
 Past winners on Official Website

Cyclo-cross races
Recurring sporting events established in 2007
2007 establishments in Belgium
Cycle races in Belgium
Sport in East Flanders
Maldegem